Jamalabad (also Romanized as Jamālābād) is a village in Qaflankuh-e Sharqi Rural District, Kaghazkonan District, Meyaneh County, East Azerbaijan Province, Iran. At the 2006 census, its population was 24, in 8 families.

The Jamalabad Caravanserai is located nearby this village.

References 

Populated places in Meyaneh County